Joaquina Sitches (born María Joaquina Sitches y Irisarri; 28 July 1780 – 10 May 1864), also known under the stage name of Joaquina Briones or, after her marriage, of Joaquina García, was a Spanish actress and operatic soprano.

Life
She was born as María Joaquina Sitches y Irisarri to Martín Sitches and Lorenza Irisarri. Joaquina Sitches was the second wife of the tenor, composer and impresario Manuel García, and the mother of the pedagogue Manuel García the younger, of the mezzo Maria Malibran, and of the mezzo and composer Pauline Viardot.

All three children were gifted and benefited from the early training by their father.  On her husband's death, when Pauline was not yet 11 years old, Sitches took charge of her vocal training.

Genealogy

References
Notes

Sources
Caswell, Austin B. (in Briscoe, James R., ed.) (1987), "Pauline Viardot-Garcia (1821–1910)", Historical Anthology of Music by Women, Volume 1, on books.googlebooks.co.uk. Indiana University Press

1780 births
Place of birth missing
1864 deaths
Place of death missing
Spanish operatic sopranos
19th-century Spanish actresses
18th-century Spanish actresses
18th-century Spanish opera singers
19th-century Spanish women opera singers